José Filipe Correia Semedo (born 26 December 1979) is a Cape Verdean former professional footballer who played as a forward.

Club career
Born in Lisbon, Portugal, Semedo started his senior career with local amateurs C.F. Benfica, signing for neighbouring Odivelas F.C. in 2001. After stellar performances with the latter in the third division (18 goals in 29 matches in the 2007–08 season), he attracted attention from Primeira Liga clubs, eventually joining Rio Ave FC. In his first appearance in the competition, on 24 August 2008, he scored in a 1–1 home draw against S.L. Benfica. 

Semedo moved to Cyprus in January 2009, teaming up with several Portuguese players at APOP Kinyras FC. In May 2010, after two solid campaigns – including 22 First Division goals in 2009–10, best in the competition – he stayed in the country with cup holders Apollon Limassol FC.

On 7 September 2013, Semedo joined Albanian Superliga side KF Tirana on a free transfer. He made his debut for the club on 29 September, playing 55 minutes in a 2–0 away defeat to KF Teuta Durrës. He scored his first goal of the season four days later, in a 1–0 victory over KS Kastrioti in which his team returned to winning ways after three consecutive losses; late into the month, in another game that finished with the same scoreline, he netted against KF Bylis Ballsh at Selman Stërmasi Stadium.

In December 2013, Semedo made his Albanian Cup debut with Tirana, appearing in a two-legged tie against KF Lushnja and featuring respectively 80 and 44 minutes in an eventual second round exit. He was released in the winter transfer window, scoring twice in 11 competitive appearances.

International career
Although Portuguese-born, Semedo opted to represent Cape Verde internationally, starting in the 2010 FIFA World Cup qualifying stage. His debut occurred on 11 October 2008 in that competition, and he scored in a 3–1 loss in Tanzania.

Two years later, on 24 May 2010, Semedo won his second and last cap, against his birth country Portugal, coming on as a 25th-minute substitute in the goalless draw in Covilhã.

International goals
Scores and results list Cape Verde's goal tally first.

Honours
APOP
Cypriot Cup: 2008–09

Apollon Limassol
Cypriot Cup runner-up: 2010–11

References

External links

1979 births
Living people
Portuguese sportspeople of Cape Verdean descent
Cape Verdean footballers
Footballers from Lisbon
Association football forwards
Primeira Liga players
Segunda Divisão players
Odivelas F.C. players
Rio Ave F.C. players
S.U. 1º Dezembro players
Casa Pia A.C. players
Cypriot First Division players
Cypriot Second Division players
APOP Kinyras FC players
Apollon Limassol FC players
Enosis Neon Paralimni FC players
Nea Salamis Famagusta FC players
Omonia Aradippou players
Kategoria Superiore players
KF Tirana players
Cape Verde international footballers
Cape Verdean expatriate footballers
Expatriate footballers in Cyprus
Expatriate footballers in Albania
Portuguese expatriate sportspeople in Cyprus